The Mantelli-Fossa MF-1  was a single-seat primary glider built in Italy in 1934. Only one was constructed.

Design and development

The Mantelli-Fossa MF-1 was designed by Adriano Mantelli, an experienced  aircraft modeller.  To fund its construction, Mantelli, his cousin Dino Sirocchi and some other aircraft modellers founded a company named SDAM after their senior partners' initials.  The MF-1 was built by Ennio Fossa in his family workshop. It was a high-wing monoplane, its wing supported centrally on a fuselage pedestal and braced on each side with a faired V strut from beyond mid-span to the lower fuselage. It was mounted without dihedral and was rectangular in plan apart from cropped aileron tips.

The fuselage, rectangular in cross-section though with a rounded decking, was entirely fabric-covered. There was an open cockpit immediately ahead of the pedestal.  Aft of the wing the fuselage tapered to the tail, where a triangular tailplane with rectangular elevators was placed on top of it.  The fin was small and triangular and carried a straight-edged balanced rudder which extended down to the keel, operating in an elevator cut-out.  The MF-1 landed on a conventional wooden skid fitted with rubber shock absorbers, assisted by a very small tail skid.

Mantelli flew the MF-1 for the first time on 14 August 1934.  Later that year he competed in it at Cantù in the Littoriali Contests.

Specifications

References

1930s Italian sailplanes
Aircraft first flown in 1934